The 2019 Virginia Cavaliers men's soccer team represented University of Virginia during the 2019 NCAA Division I men's soccer season.  The Cavaliers were led by head coach George Gelnovatch, in his twenty-fourth season.  They played home games at Klöckner Stadium.  This was be the team's 79th season playing organized men's college soccer and their 67th playing in the Atlantic Coast Conference. They had entered the NCAA Tournament as the No. 1 seed and were the runner-up.

Previous season 

The 2018 Virginia Cavaliers team finished the season with a final overall record of 10–4–3, and final ACC record of 3–3–2. The Cavaliers were seeded sixth-overall in the 2018 ACC Men's Soccer Tournament, where they were upset in the first round by Pittsburgh.  The Cavaliers earned an at-large bid into the 2018 NCAA Division I Men's Soccer Tournament, continuing their record streak of consecutive NCAA appearances going at 38 appearances. In the NCAA Tournament, Virginia was seeded tenth overall in the tournament, where they reached third round before losing to Notre Dame.

Player movement

Players leaving

Players arriving

Squad

Roster 
Updated August 20, 2019

Team management

Source:

Schedule 

Source:

|-
!colspan=7 style=""| Exhibition
|-

|-
!colspan=7 style=""| Regular Season
|-

|-
!colspan=7 style=""| ACC Tournament

|-
!colspan=7 style=""| NCAA Tournament

Awards and honors

2020 MLS Super Draft

Source:

Rankings

References

External links 
Official Site 

2019
Virginia Cavaliers
Virginia Cavaliers
Virginia Cavaliers men's soccer team
Virginia Cavaliers
2019 Virginia Cavaliers
Atlantic Coast Conference men's soccer champion seasons